Proctor's Theater, also known as Proctor's Palace and RKO Proctor's, is a historic movie theater located at Yonkers, Westchester County, New York. It was built 1914-1916 and operated initially as a vaudeville house. William E. Lehman was the theater's architect. It became part of the RKO Pictures circuit in 1929 and closed as a movie theater in 1973. It was subsequently converted to retail and office use.

It was added to the National Register of Historic Places in 2008.

References

Further reading
Proctor's Palace Theatre; After the final curtain blog post (includes interior photographs)

External links

Hudson Valley Ruins website

Theatres on the National Register of Historic Places in New York (state)
Theatres completed in 1914
Buildings and structures in Yonkers, New York
National Register of Historic Places in Yonkers, New York